Virginia Graham, born Virginia Komiss, (July 4, 1912 – December 22, 1998) was an American daytime television talk show host from the mid-1950s to the mid-1970s. On television, Graham hosted the syndicated programs Food for Thought (1953–1957), Girl Talk (1963–1969) and The Virginia Graham Show (1970–1972). She was also a guest on many other programs.

Biography

Early life and education
Graham was born and raised in Chicago. Her father, an immigrant from Germany, became a successful businessman who owned the Komiss department-store chain. She graduated from the private Francis Parker School in Chicago, and in 1931, received her degree from the University of Chicago, where she had studied anthropology. She later earned a master's degree in journalism from Northwestern University.

Marriage
In 1935, Graham married Harry William Guttenberg, who owned a theatrical costume company. They remained married until his death in 1980. The couple had one daughter, Lynn Guttenberg Bohrer. Graham's book about her husband's death, Life After Harry: My Adventures in Widowhood, became a bestseller in 1988.

Career

After World War II, Graham wrote scripts for radio soap operas such as Stella Dallas, Our Gal Sunday and Backstage Wife. She hosted her first radio talk show in 1951. Graham was a panelist on the DuMont panel show Where Was I? (1952–53). She succeeded Margaret Truman in 1956 as cohost of the NBC radio show Weekday, teamed with Mike Wallace.

In 1982, Graham played fictional talk show host Stella Stanton in the final episodes of the soap opera Texas. 

She was described by writer Howard Thompson in The New York Times as "a bright, alert, talkative woman of ripe, tart-edged candor." Another writer, Richard L. Coe, said she looked like "Sophie Tucker doing a Carol Channing performance."

Graham, a cancer survivor, was a fundraiser for the American Cancer Society. A former smoker, she denounced smoking, but when asked on her program what she would do if she knew that the world would end tomorrow, she confessed that she would smoke.

Graham died of a heart attack on December 22, 1998.

Filmography

Books
 There Goes What's Her Name: The Continuing Saga of Virginia Graham (with Jean Libman Block), 1965.
 Don't Blame the Mirror (with Jean Libman Block), 1967. Self-improvement, beauty advice.
 If I Made It, So Can You, 1978.
 Life After Harry: My Adventures in Widowhood, 1988.
 Look Who's Sleeping in My Bed!, 1993. Memoir.

References

External links

 "Cackleklatsch", Time, June 7, 1968.
Clips from final Texas episodes

1912 births
1998 deaths
American television talk show hosts
American women television personalities
Television personalities from Chicago
University of Chicago alumni
Northwestern University alumni
American radio hosts
American radio writers
Women radio writers
20th-century American writers
20th-century American women writers
Writers from Chicago
 Francis W. Parker School (Chicago) alumni
American people of German descent